is finely ground powder of specially grown and processed green tea leaves, traditionally consumed in East Asia. The green tea plants used for matcha are shade-grown for three to four weeks before harvest; the stems and veins are removed during processing. During shaded growth, the plant Camellia sinensis produces more theanine and caffeine. The powdered form of matcha is consumed differently from tea leaves or tea bags, as it is suspended in a liquid, typically water or milk.

The traditional Japanese tea ceremony centers on the preparation, serving and drinking of matcha as hot tea, and embodies a meditative spirituality. In modern times, matcha is also used to flavor and dye foods, such as mochi and soba noodles, green tea ice cream, matcha lattes and a variety of Japanese wagashi confectionery. Matcha used in ceremonies is referred to as ceremonial-grade, meaning that the powder is of a high enough quality to be used in the tea ceremony. Lower-quality matcha is referred to as culinary-grade, but no standard industry definition or requirements exist for matcha.

Blends of matcha are given poetic names known as chamei ("tea names") either by the producing plantation, shop, or creator of the blend, or by the grand master of a particular tea tradition. When a blend is named by the grand master of a tea ceremony lineage, it becomes known as the master's konomi.

History 

In China during the Tang dynasty (618–907), tea leaves were steamed and formed into tea bricks for storage and trade. The tea was prepared by roasting and pulverizing the tea, decocting the resulting tea powder in hot water, and then adding salt. During the Song dynasty (960–1279), the method of making powdered tea from steam-prepared dried tea leaves and preparing the beverage by whipping the tea powder and hot water together in a bowl became popular.

Preparation and consumption of powdered tea was formed into a ritual by Chan Buddhists. The earliest extant Chan monastic code, titled Chanyuan Qinggui (Rules of Purity for the Chan Monastery, 1103), describes in detail the etiquette for tea ceremonies.

Zen Buddhism and methods of preparing powdered tea were brought to Japan by Eisai in 1191. In Japan, it became an important item at Zen monasteries, and from the 14th through the 16th centuries, it was highly appreciated by members of the upper echelons of society.

Production 

Matcha is made from shade-grown tea leaves that also are used to make gyokuro. The preparation of matcha starts several weeks before harvest and may last up to 20 days, when the tea bushes are covered to prevent direct sunlight. This slows down growth, stimulates an increase in chlorophyll levels, turns the leaves a darker shade of green, and causes the production of amino acids, in particular theanine. After harvesting, if the leaves are rolled up before drying as in the production of sencha (煎茶), the result will be gyokuro (jade dew) tea. If the leaves are laid out flat to dry, however, they will crumble somewhat and become known as tencha. Then, tencha may be deveined, destemmed, and stone-ground to the fine, bright green, talc-like powder known as matcha.

Grinding the leaves is a slow process because the mill stones must not get too warm, lest the aroma of the leaves be altered. Up to one hour may be needed to grind 30 grams of matcha.

The flavour of matcha is dominated by its amino acids. The highest grades of matcha have a more intense sweetness and deeper flavour than the standard or coarser grades of tea harvested later in the year.

Tencha 

Tencha refers to green tea leaves that have not yet been ground into fine powder as matcha, as the leaves are instead left to dry rather than be kneaded. Since the leaves' cell walls are still intact, brewing tencha tea results in a pale green brew, which has a more mellow taste compared to other green tea extracts, and only the highest grade of tencha leaves can brew to its fullest flavor. Tencha leaves are half the weight of other tea leaves such as sencha and gyokuro so most tencha brews require double the number of leaves. About an hour is needed to grind 40 to 70 g of tencha leaves into matcha, and matcha does not retain its freshness as long as tencha in powder form because powder begins to oxidize. Drinking and brewing tencha is traditionally prohibited by the Japanese tea ceremony.

Grades 

Commercial considerations, especially outside Japan, have increasingly seen matcha marketed according to "grades", indicating quality.

Of the following terms "ceremonial grade" is not recognised in Japan but "food grade" or "culinary grade" are.
 Ceremonial grade designates tea for its use in tea ceremonies and Buddhist temples. All must be able to be used in koicha (濃茶), a "thick tea" with a high proportion of powder to water used in traditional tea ceremony.
 Premium grade is high-quality matcha green tea that contains young tea leaves from the top of the tea plant. Best for daily consumption, it is characterized by a fresh, subtle flavor, usually perfect for both new and everyday matcha drinkers alike.
 Cooking/culinary grade is the cheapest of all. Suitable for cooking purposes, smoothies etc. It is slightly bitter due to factors such as its production from leaves lower down on the tea plant, terroir, the time of harvest, or the process of its manufacture.

In general, matcha is expensive compared to other forms of green tea, although its price depends on its quality. Higher grades are pricier due to the production methods and younger leaves used, and thus they have a more delicate flavor.

Catechin concentration is highly dependent on leaf age (the leaf bud and the first leaf are richest in epigallocatechin gallate), but catechin levels also vary greatly between plant varieties and whether the plants are grown in shade.

Chemical compositions of various grades of matcha were studied, with the results showing that the contents of caffeine, free amino acids, theanine, and vitamin C decreased with the decreasing price of matcha.

Location on the tea bush 
Where leaves destined for tencha are picked on the tea bush is vital for different grades of matcha. The young developing leaves on the top of the plant, that are soft and supple, are used for higher grades of matcha, resulting in a finer texture and flavour. For the lower grades, older more developed leaves are used, giving them a sandy texture and slightly bitter flavour.

Treatment before processing 
Traditionally, sencha leaves are dried outside in the shade and are never exposed to direct sunlight; however, now drying has mostly moved indoors. Quality matcha is vibrantly green as a result of this treatment.

Stone grinding 
Without the correct equipment and technique, matcha can become "burnt" and suffer degraded quality. Typically, in Japan, it is stone-ground to a fine powder through the use of specially designed granite stone mills.

Oxidation 
Oxidation is also a factor in determining grade. Matcha exposed to oxygen may easily become compromised. Oxidized matcha has a distinctive hay-like smell, and a dull brownish-green color.

Traditional preparation 

Prior to use, the matcha is often forced through a sieve to break up clumps. Special sieves are available for this purpose, which are usually stainless steel and combine a fine wire-mesh sieve and a temporary storage container. A special wooden spatula is used to force the tea through the sieve, or a small, smooth stone may be placed on top of the sieve and the device shaken gently.

If the sieved matcha is to be served at a Japanese tea ceremony, then it will be placed into a small tea caddy known as a chaki. Otherwise, it can be scooped directly from the sieve into a chawan.

About 2–4 grams of matcha is placed into the bowl, traditionally using a bamboo scoop called a chashaku, and then about 60–80 ml of hot water are added.

Usucha creates a lighter and slightly more bitter tea.

Koicha, or thick tea, requires significantly more matcha (usually about doubling the powder and halving the water): about 3.75 g (amounting to 3 heaped chashaku scoops, or about one teaspoon) of matcha and 40 ml (1.3 fl oz) of hot water per serving, or as many as 6 teaspoons to  cups of water. Because the resulting mixture is significantly thicker (with a similar consistency to liquid honey), blending it requires a slower, stirring motion that does not produce foam. Koicha is normally made with more expensive matcha from older tea trees (exceeding 30 years), thus producing a milder and sweeter tea than usucha. It is served almost exclusively as part of Japanese tea ceremonies.

The mixture of water and tea powder is whisked to a uniform consistency using a bamboo whisk known as a chasen. No lumps should be left in the liquid, and no ground tea should remain on the sides of the bowl. Because matcha may be bitter, it is traditionally served with a small wagashi sweet (intended to be consumed before drinking), but without added milk or sugar. It is usually considered that 40 g of matcha provides for 20 bowls of usucha or 10 bowls of koicha:

Other uses 
It is used in castella, manjū, and monaka; as a topping for shaved ice (kakigōri); mixed with milk and sugar as a drink; and mixed with salt and used to flavour tempura in a mixture known as matcha-jio. It is also used as flavouring in many Western-style chocolates, candy, and desserts, such as cakes and pastries, including Swiss rolls and cheesecake, cookies, pudding, mousse, and green tea ice cream. Matcha frozen yogurt is sold in shops and can be made at home using Greek yogurt.  The snacks Pocky and Kit Kat have matcha-flavoured versions in Japan. It may also be mixed into other forms of tea. For example, it is added to genmaicha to form matcha-iri genmaicha (literally, roasted brown rice and green tea with added matcha).

The use of matcha in modern drinks has also spread to North American cafés, such as Starbucks, which introduced "green tea lattes" and other matcha-flavoured drinks after they became successful in their Japanese store locations. As in Japan, it has become integrated into lattes, iced drinks, milkshakes, and smoothies.

Basic matcha teaware 

The equipment required for the making of matcha is:

Large enough to whisk the fine powder tea around 

A bamboo whisk with fine bristles to whisk or whip the tea foam

A bamboo spoon to measure the powder tea into the tea bowl (not the same as a Western teaspoon)

A container for the matcha powder tea

A small cotton cloth for cleaning teaware during the tea ceremony

Flavor 

Theanine, succinic acid, gallic acid, and theogallin are chemical factors contributing to the umami-enhancing flavor of matcha. Compared to traditional green tea, the production of matcha requires the tea leaves to be protected from sunlight. Shading results in an increase in caffeine, and total free amino acids, including theanine, but also reduces the accumulation of catechins in leaves.

See also 
 Green tea
 Food powder

Notes

References

External links 
 

Chadō
Chinese tea
Food powders
Green tea
Japanese tea
Tang dynasty